Abu Tahir Muhammad ibn Muhammad ibn Baqiyya, also known as Nasir-al-Dawla, Naseh, best known as Ibn Baqiyya, was a statesman of the Buyid dynasty, who served as the vizier of Izz al-Dawla from 973 to 977.

Biography 
A native of Awana, a place near Baghdad, Ibn Baqiyya belonged to a low-class family. Because of this, he would later get suspected by his opponents in helping low-class statesman to prominent posts. He first appears during conquest of Abbasid Iraq by Buyid ruler Mu'izz al-Dawla. He soon rapidly rose to higher posts, and by 973 managed to become the vizier of Mu'izz al-Dawla's son and successor, Izz al-Dawla (r. 967–978). However, hostiles slowly arose between Izz al-Dawla and his cousin Adud al-Dawla, who ruled in Fars and Kerman. Ibn Baqiyya, who knew of the strong power which Adud al-Dawla possessed, sought to gain his favor. 

In 975, Adud al-Dawla invaded Iraq; meanwhile Izz al-Dawla suspected Ibn Baqiyya of treachery, and after his defeat at Ahvaz in 977 by Adud al-Dawla, removed Ibn Baqiyya from the vizierate and had him blinded. After a bloody struggle, Adud al-Dawla managed in the end to defeat Izz al-Dawla and have him executed. Ibn Baqiyya was spared, but because an insult he had made to Adud al-Dawla he was later arrested by a force sent by Adud al-Dawla under Bahram ibn Ardashir al-Majusi and other statesmen; Ibn Baqiyya was shortly trampled to death, and would first be buried after the death of Adud al-Dawla in 983.

Sources
 
 
 

Buyid viziers
978 deaths
10th-century births
Year of birth unknown

People executed by the Buyid dynasty
10th century in Iraq